"The End of Heartache" is the title track and second single from Killswitch Engage's third studio album The End of Heartache. The song also appeared as the theme song for the 2004 zombie action film Resident Evil: Apocalypse.

The song became the band's breakthrough single, peaking at no. 31 on the Mainstream Rock Chart.

Music video
Two videos were produced for the song. The video edit of the song features mostly clean singing from vocalist Howard Jones with a few background screams, much like the video for "My Curse".

The first video shows the band performing the song inter-cut with footage from Resident Evil: Apocalypse along with close-up shots of the band playing.

The second video cuts out the Resident Evil: Apocalypse footage and cuts between shots of the band performing the song.

Reception
The song was included on Revolver'''s list of "16 Great Non-Hair-Metal Power Ballads".

Awards
The song was nominated for Best Metal Performance at the 47th Annual Grammy Awards, but lost to Whiplash by Motörhead.

Track listingResident Evil: Apocalypse'' promo single

US/UK promo single

Personnel
Killswitch Engage
 Howard Jones – lead vocals
 Adam Dutkiewicz – lead guitar, backing vocals
 Joel Stroetzel – rhythm guitar
 Mike D'Antonio – bass guitar
 Justin Foley – drums

Additional musicians
 Andy Sneap – additional guitar

Charts

Certifications

References

2004 singles
2004 songs
Killswitch Engage songs
Roadrunner Records singles
Heavy metal ballads
Music videos directed by Tony Petrossian
Songs written by Howard Jones (American musician)